Alpha Radio (formerly 103.2 Alpha Radio), Alpha 103.2, 103.2 Alpha FM, Alpha Radio) was an Independent Local Radio station based in Darlington, County Durham, England.

History

When launched in 1995, Alpha was owned by Radio Investments Ltd while First Radio Sales

In 2009, Alpha was joined by neighbouring station Minster Northallerton to share the studio complex in a cost-cutting exercise. To make further savings, both Alpha and Minster Northallerton, along with Durham FM were rebranded as Star Radio North East which meant all three stations lost their heritage names and, until recently, only produced a daily breakfast show.  Since June 2010, output has been networked across all frequencies, although commercial breaks are still unique to the three areas.

In its history, Alpha 103.2/ Alpha FM/ Alpha Radio had many jingle packages and imaging updates. In 2002, The Local Radio Group introduced Bespoke Music Jingles to its group of stations. This then launched an iconic sung logo for Alpha 103.2. Alpha had four main jingle packages from Bespoke. They were introduced in 2001, 2003, 2007 and 2009. During 2003/ 2006, Alpha lost its Jingles in favour of imaging when the Music:Fun:Life streamline was introduced. The main station Voice overs for Alpha throughout its life were, Emma Clarke, Chris Marsden, Jeff Davies and Greg Marsden.

The last ever Alpha Jingles were by sung radio jingles made by Bespoke Music. but had the name tweaked when the station changed names from Alpha 103.2 to Alpha Radio.Most recently the station had sung radio jingles made by Bespoke Music. The main station imaging for Alpha was designed and produced in house via the TLRC from Minster FM in York which was made as a generic package for the TLRC group and sent to all local station within the portfolio to be edited into 'local ID's' however later, the imaging was produced in Darlington's Woodland Road studio's via various producers such as Chris Hakin, Craig Bailey, Dan Callum and Dave Lee.

Past presenters

Peter Quest
Mark Brooks
Phil Holmes
Andy Carter
Michael Patterson
Martin Lowes
Dave Collins
Ricky Durkin
Chris Hakin
John Harding
Mark Reason
Paul Anderson
Alan Douglas
Mike Nicholson
Shaun Harrington
Emma Hignett
Roger Kennedy
Joel Ross
Paul Smith OBE
Steve Phillips
Nick Pierce a.k.a. Rafe Parker
Tim West
Richard Kell
Dave Lee
Victor winther
Gary Burgham
Steve White
Gary Wilkinson
James Watt
Mike 'Patto' Patterson
Andrew 'Gazza' Gascoigne
Craig Bailey
Nick Hancock
Les Gunn
Lisa Marrey
Chris Curtis
John Pierce

References

External links
Media UK entry 

The Local Radio Company
Radio stations established in 1995
Radio stations disestablished in 2010
Defunct radio stations in the United Kingdom
Borough of Darlington
Radio stations in North East England